Athrips kostjuki is a moth of the family Gelechiidae. It is found in Russia (Tuva). The habitat consists of semi-deserts.

The wingspan is 15–16 mm. The forewings are greyish brown mottled with numerous ochreous scales and with a paired indistinct dark spot near the base and at about one-half, as well as a small spot at two-thirds. The hindwings are grey.

References

Moths described in 2005
Athrips
Moths of Asia